John B. McColl (March 20, 1893 - December 19, 1938) served in the California State Senate for the 5th from 1933 until his death in 1938. He was born in Canada.

McColl died in a crash car from his injuries.

References

20th-century American politicians
Republican Party California state senators
1893 births
1938 deaths
United States Army personnel of World War I
Politicians from Winnipeg